Poland competed at the 1932 Summer Olympics in Los Angeles, United States. 51 competitors, 42 men and 9 women, took part in 21 events in 4 sports.

Medalists

Athletics

Men
Track & road events

Field events

Combined events – Decathlon

Women
Track & road events

Field events

Fencing

Six fencers, all men, represented Poland in 1932.

 Men

Ranks given are within the pool.

Rowing

Men

Art competitions

References

External links
Official Olympic Reports
International Olympic Committee results database

Nations at the 1932 Summer Olympics
1932
1932 in Polish sport